Cynometra lukei is a species of plant in the family Fabaceae. It is found in Kenya and Tanzania and threatened by habitat loss.

References

lukei
Flora of Kenya
Flora of Tanzania
Endangered plants
Taxonomy articles created by Polbot
Taxa named by Henk Jaap Beentje